The 2001 European Weightlifting Championships were held in Trenčín, Slovakia. It was the 80th edition of the event.

Medal overview

Men

Women

References
Results (sports123)

European Weightlifting Championships
2001 in Slovak sport
International weightlifting competitions hosted by Slovakia
2001 in weightlifting